An organic light-emitting transistor (OLET) is a form of transistor that emits light. These transistors have potential for digital displays and on-chip optical interconnects.
OLET is a new light-emission concept, providing planar light sources that can be easily integrated in substrates like silicon, glass, and paper using standard microelectronic techniques.

OLETs differ from OLEDs in that an active matrix can be made entirely of OLETs, whereas OLEDs must be combined with switching elements such as TFTs.

See also
Light-emitting diode (LED)
Light-emitting transistor (LET)
Organic field-effect transistor (OFET)
Organic light-emitting diode (OLED)

References

Emerging technologies
Molecular electronics
Nonlinear optics
Organic electronics
Photonics